In physics, a state space is an abstract space in which different "positions" represent, not literal locations, but rather states of some physical system. This makes it a type of phase space.

Quantum Mechanics 
Specifically, in quantum mechanics a state space is a complex Hilbert space in which each unit vector represents a different state that could come out of a measurement. Each unit vector specifies a different dimension, so the numbers of dimensions in this Hilbert space depends on the system we choose to describe. Any state vector in this space can be written as a linear combination of unit vectors. Having an nonzero component along multiple dimensions is called a superposition.  These state vectors, using Dirac's bra–ket notation, can often be treated like coordinate vectors and operated on using the rules of linear algebra. This Dirac formalism of quantum mechanics can replace calculation of complicated integrals with simpler vector operations.

See also
Configuration space (physics) for the space of possible positions that a physical system may attain
Configuration space (mathematics) for the space of positions of particles in a topological space
State space (controls) for information about state space in control engineering
State space for information about discrete state space in computer science

Notes

References

Concepts in physics
Hilbert space